Jacqueline Kolosov (born in Chicago) is an American poet, children's book author, and professor. Her most recent collection of poetry is Modigliani's Muse (WordTech Communications, 2009), and her most recent young adult novel is A Sweet Disorder (Hyperion Books, 2009). Her poetry has appeared in literary journals and magazines including The Southern Review, Shenandoah, Poetry, Passages North Orion, PRISM International, The Malahat Review, Ecotone, and Western Humanities Review, and her honors include a fellowship from the National Endowment for the Arts.

She was raised in and around Chicago and graduated from University of Chicago with a B.A. and an M.A., and from New York University with a Ph.D. She teaches currently at Texas Tech University. She lives in West Texas with husband, poet William Wenthe, and their daughter Sophia.  Jacqueline is a vegetarian and loves to ride horses.

Honors and awards
 2008 NEA Literature Fellowship
 2005 Glen Workshop Fellowship, Image Magazine
 1992-1996 Multi-Year Fellowship, New York University

Published works
Full-Length Poetry Collections

 
 

Chapbooks
 
 
 Fabergé, Finishing Line Press, 2003
 Danish Ocean, Pudding House Press, 2003

Juvenile Fiction
 
 
 

Juvenile Nonfiction
 
 
 

Anthologies Edited
 

Cookbooks
 Cooking with Horse, Self-Published, 2010

References

External links

Poem: Orion Magazine > July/August 2007 > Quickening by Jacqueline Kolosov
Interview: Rebecca's Book Blog > June 9, 2009 > "Interview with Jacqueline Kolosov" by Rebecca Herman

Year of birth missing (living people)
Living people
American women poets
University of Chicago alumni
New York University alumni
Texas Tech University faculty
National Endowment for the Arts Fellows
American women novelists
Poets from Texas
Writers from Chicago
21st-century American novelists
American young adult novelists
Poets from Illinois
21st-century American women writers
21st-century American poets
Women writers of young adult literature
Novelists from Texas
Novelists from Illinois
American women academics